Newcraighall is a railway station on the Borders Railway, which runs between  and . It is owned by Network Rail and managed by ScotRail.

History
The station was opened by Railtrack on 3 June 2002, and served as a terminus station for the Edinburgh Crossrail.

The station now serves as a park and ride for Midlothian and the Scottish Borders.

Though the Waverley Route never had a station at this location, one did exist briefly at nearby Niddrie. It was opened in June 1843 by the Edinburgh and Dalkeith Railway, operating intermittently until the station's ultimate closure in January 1869.

Services

As of the December 2022 timetable change, the station is served Mon-Sat by an half-hourly service between Edinburgh Waverley and Tweedbank. Services are hourly only during the evenings and all day on Sundays. All services are operated by ScotRail.

Rolling stock used: Class 158 Express Sprinter and Class 170 Turbostar

References

External links
 
 

Railway stations in Edinburgh
Railway stations opened by Railtrack
Railway stations in Great Britain opened in 2002
Railway stations served by ScotRail
2002 establishments in Scotland
Borders Railway